Şchiopu is a Romanian surname. Notable people with the surname include:

 Cristian Șchiopu (born 1974), Romanian footballer
 Dumitru Șchiopu (born 1959), Romanian boxer

Romanian-language surnames